Meike de Nooy (born 2 May 1983 in Eindhoven) is a water polo player of the Netherlands who represents the Dutch national team in international competitions.

de Nooy was part of the team that became sixth at the 2003 World Aquatics Championships in Barcelona. She also was in the team that became tenth at the 2005 World Aquatics Championships in Montreal and at the 2007 World Aquatics Championships in Melbourne where they finished in 9th position. They started a new campaign with a mix of experienced and talented players to work towards a new top team for the 2012 Summer Olympics in London. The Dutch team finished in fifth place at the 2008 Women's European Water Polo Championship in Málaga and they qualified for the 2008 Summer Olympics in Beijing. There they ended up winning the gold medal on 21 August, beating the United States 9–8 in the final.

See also
 Netherlands women's Olympic water polo team records and statistics
 List of Olympic champions in women's water polo
 List of Olympic medalists in water polo (women)
 List of women's Olympic water polo tournament goalkeepers
 List of World Aquatics Championships medalists in water polo

References

External links
 

1983 births
Living people
Sportspeople from Eindhoven
Dutch female water polo players
Water polo goalkeepers
Water polo players at the 2008 Summer Olympics
Medalists at the 2008 Summer Olympics
Olympic gold medalists for the Netherlands in water polo
20th-century Dutch women
21st-century Dutch women